DWWX-TV (channel 2) was the flagship VHF station of Philippine television network ABS-CBN. The station was owned and operated by ABS-CBN Corporation with its studio and transmitter located at the ABS-CBN Broadcasting Center, Sgt. Esguerra Ave., corner Mo. Ignacia Ave., Diliman, Quezon City. It was the first and oldest television station in the Philippines. The station served as the originating channel of the network's national television programming, which broadcast to all its regional stations.

As of May 5, 2020, the station's broadcasting activities, together with that of its sister television and radio stations, were suspended following the cease-and-desist order issued by the National Telecommunications Commission due to the expiration of ABS-CBN's legislative license to operate.

History

Beginnings (1953–1972)
DWWX-TV traces its history to the first Philippine television station DZAQ-TV, owned by Bolinao Electronics Corporation. In 1949, James Lindenberg, owner of BEC, became the first applicant for a congressional license to establish a television station in the Philippines. His application was granted on June 14, 1950. Because of the strict import controls and the lack of raw materials needed to open a TV station during those days, Lindenberg branched to radio broadcasting instead.

Judge Antonio Quirino, brother of then President Elpidio Quirino, also tried to apply for a license but was denied. He later acquired shares of stock from BEC, gained controlling interest and renamed the company from BEC to Alto Broadcasting System (ABS).

DZAQ-TV Channel 3 began commercial television operations on October 23, 1953, the first fully licensed commercial television station in the Philippines. The first program that aired was a garden party at the Quirino residence in Sitio Alto, San Juan. After the premiere telecast, the station followed a four-hour-a-day schedule, from six to ten in the evening.

The first program broadcast at 6:00 PST during the sign-on/opening ceremony with the playing of the national anthem of the Philippines "Lupang Hinirang", followed by an announcement of that day's programs and the commencement of ABS television programming.

On June 16, 1955, Republic Act No. 1343 signed by President Ramon Magsaysay granted Manila Chronicle owners Eugenio Lopez, Sr. and former Vice President Fernando Lopez, a radio-TV franchise from the Congress and immediately established Chronicle Broadcasting Network (CBN) on September 24, 1956, which initially focused only on radio broadcasting. On February 24, 1957, Lopez called Judge Quirino to his house for breakfast and ABS was bought under a contract written on a table napkin. The corporate name was reverted to Bolinao Electronics Corporation immediately after the purchase by the Lopezes.

With the establishment by CBN of DZXL-TV Channel 9 on April 19 (or July), 1958, the Lopez brothers controlled both television channels in the archipelago, and plans were underway to build a new headquarters for the network in Roxas Boulevard in Pasay, which was officially opened at the same year, and later became the official studios for channels 3 and 9. The monopoly in television was broken in 1960 when DZTV-TV 13 was established by the Inter-Island Broadcasting Corporation (now Intercontinental Broadcasting Corporation) (IBC), then owned by Dick Baldwin. By 1961, with the official launch of its first ever regional station in Cebu, the ABS-CBN brand was officially used for the first time on the station in newspaper ads promoting the first ever locally produced television dramas, Hiwaga sa Bahay na Bato and Mga Bayani sa Kalawakan.

In 1963, DZAQ-TV Channel 3 began test broadcast in color. In 1966, ABS-CBN became the first TV station to broadcast selected shows in color.

On February 1, 1967, the company was renamed ABS–CBN Broadcasting Corporation. This company became the formal merger of the two stations DZAQ-TV Channel 3 and DZXL-TV Channel 9.

On December 18, 1968, ABS-CBN inaugurated its ABS-CBN Broadcast Center complex in Bohol Avenue, Quezon City. The complex was then the most advanced broadcasting facility of its kind during its time in Asia after NHK in Japan.

In March 1969, DZXL-TV transferred from channel 9 to channel 4. On October 15, 1969, Kanlaon Broadcasting System (now Radio Philippines Network) took over the channel 9 frequency with DZKB-TV (KBS-9) as its call sign. On November 14, 1969, DZAQ-TV transferred from channel 3 to channel 2, the current and permanent positioning frequency of the station.

BBC (1973–1986)
When then President Ferdinand Marcos declared martial law with Proclamation No. 1081 on September 23, 1972, ABS-CBN was forced to shut down. Its stations were seized from the Lopezes - DZAQ-TV Channel 2 was turned over to Roberto Benedicto and became DWWX-TV Channel 2 (BBC-2) under Banahaw Broadcasting Corporation in 1973; DZXL-TV Channel 4 was turned over to the National Media Production Center and became GTV-4 in 1974.

Its newly built ABS-CBN Broadcast Center was renamed Broadcast Plaza in 1974 and became the home of BBC-2, KBS-9 and GTV-4. In 1978, BBC-2 and KBS-9 would relocate Benedicto's newly built Broadcast City complex, along with IBC-13 (Intercontinental Broadcasting Corporation) (originally from San Juan) which was also controlled by Benedicto. GTV-4 would remain in Broadcast Plaza and became MBS-4 (Maharlika Broadcasting System) in 1980.

As the People Power Revolution broke out and the Marcos's grip on power crumbled, the reformists in the Armed Forces of the Philippines (who were also supporters of Corazon Aquino) saw that TV would be a vital asset for victory. Thus, at 10 a.m. on February 24, 1986, they attacked and took Broadcast Plaza. The name of MBS-4 was changed to its interim name The New TV-4 (until it was officially rebranded as the People's Television Network (PTV) in April 1986) that afternoon, with the broadcasts spearheaded by former ABS-CBN talents and newsreaders.

Revival of ABS-CBN (1986–2020)
After Marcos was deposed during the People Power Revolution, the Benedicto networks BBC, RPN and IBC were sequestered by the newly formed Presidential Commission on Good Government. DWWX-TV Channel 2 and a portion of the Broadcast Center were returned to the Lopezes but DWGT-TV Channel 4 remained with the government.

On September 14, 1986, ABS-CBN went back on the air, broadcasting (after almost two months of test broadcast) from what used to be their main garage at Broadcast Center in the pre-Martial Law days. President Corazon Aquino together with the staff managed to re-open its facilities after the revolution. Back then they had to share space in the building that was rightfully theirs, which was then occupied for the most part by the government TV station Channel 4. Cash was low and resources stretched to the limit, with offices being made to double as dressing rooms and basics such as chairs, tables and telephones in short supply during the months ABS-CBN stayed at the Benpres Building in Pasig. By late 1986, the network placed dead last among the five stations and suffering heavy losses. Eugenio "Geny" Lopez Jr. by early 1987 brought in one of its former managers, Freddie Garcia, then working for GMA Network, and tasked him to revive the then-ailing network.

For its initial station ID, the numeral 2 is combined with the ABS-CBN logo. The features of the logo was a wing-shaped blue crest with a white curve at the top and a white line as a tail, the Broadway typeface "2" logo was used from 1986 to 1987. It had a slogan name Watch Us Do It Again! as the station ID aired since the network's revival together with Sharing A New Life With You! as another slogan name.

Six months later on March 1, 1987, Channel 2 was relaunched with the live musical special, The Star Network: Ang Pagbabalik Ng Bituin (The Return of the Star) which noted for the famous numerical white tri-ribbon channel 2 logo laced with a white rhomboidal star (from 1988 to 1992 the ribbons were tri-colored in red, green and blue) as a centerpiece of the network's revival to return its glory days when the station ID was first aired during the relaunch. By 1988, ABS-CBN was topping the number one ratings, a position it had never relinquished for 16 years.

Channel 4 would later move out of the area to a new broadcasting complex (Government Information and Media Center Building) and the new 500 ft (150 m) transmitter tower situated in Visayas Avenue, Quezon City as ABS-CBN regains full control of the facility on January 22, 1992. On December 11, 1988, it launched nationwide domestic satellite programming with its broadcast of Australian television miniseries titled A Dangerous Life and by 1994, it expanded its operations worldwide.

On June 29, 1999, Eugenio Lopez Jr. died of cancer in Hillsborough, California. Channel 2 launched its 120-kilowatt Millennium Transmitter, resulting in improved signal quality throughout Mega Manila.

In 2000, ABS-CBN launch the new station ID, "Out of the Box into the new Millennium", featuring the "ABS-CBN Millennium Overture", composed by Ryan Cayabyab. The station ID featured the past ABS-CBN logos, zooming into the last look of the old logo; transforming into the new logo, with the wordmark in a new font, replacing black square box frame into grey square/crystal plane.

In 2005, ABS-CBN upgraded its transmission capacity into a very high capacity of 346.2 kilowatts (60 kW TPO), resulting in an even clearer signal in Metro Manila.

On February 11, 2015, ABS-CBN launched its digital broadcast on ISDB-T with the launching of ABS-CBN TV Plus.

From May 9, 2016 (the day of the 2016 Philippine general election), ABS-CBN started broadcasting for 24 hours with O Shopping as its overnight programming. The network signed-off every Tuesday from 2:00 am to 4:00 am for its regular transmitter maintenance and the annual Paschal Triduum of Holy Week from 12:00 midnight to 6:00 am for its annual Holy Week maintenance. However, as O Shopping suspended its broadcast on ABS-CBN on April 21, 2020, due to the implementation of the enhanced community quarantine amid the COVID-19 pandemic, the network ceased its round-the-clock operations and reduced back to regular broadcast hours.

Cease and desist order and forced shutdown (2020–present)

On May 5, 2020, following the expiration of the network's franchise and the issuance of a cease-and-desist order by the National Telecommunications Commission, the station signed off after the airing of news program TV Patrol.

NTC gave ABS-CBN ten days to explain why its frequencies should not be recalled. There has been some criticism of the decision as politically motivated. On May 5, 2020, Tuesday, the station officially closed on 7:52 pm, local time.  On May 7, ABS-CBN, through its lawyers, filed a petition for a temporary restraining order (TRO) with the Supreme Court of the Philippines to stop the implementation of the NTC's cease-and-desist order and thus allow DWWX-TV, as well as other ABS-CBN TV and radio stations across the country to return to the airwaves whilst legislative proceedings related to ABS-CBN's franchise renewal, are still ongoing.  On May 19, 2020, the Supreme Court asked the NTC and the House of Representatives to comment on ABS-CBN's request for a TRO and is to be tackled on July 13, 2020.

On May 13, 2020, a bill to grant ABS-CBN a provisional franchise (which will allow DWWX-TV and other ABS-CBN TV and radio stations to return to the airwaves whilst legislative proceedings concerning its application for a longer-term franchise are still ongoing) until October 31, 2020, was approved at the House of Representatives on second reading.  The approval on second reading was withdrawn on May 18, 2020, after some members wanted to avoid questions over the constitutionality of holding the first and second readings on the same day but during interpellations, some members wanted to proceed directly to franchise hearings as well.  On May 19, 2020, the House of Representatives decided to forego the hearings on a bill seeking to grant ABS-CBN a provisional franchise until October 30. Instead, House Speaker Alan Peter Cayetano said they will go straight to hearings on granting the media giant a fresh 25-year franchise, which he said may take place even during the annual Congressional recess in preparation for the new session.

On September 10, 2020, the National Telecommunications Commission issued an order recalling all frequencies of the network as it no longer obtains a valid Congressional franchise to continue operating.

The network returned on free television the following month when ABS-CBN partnered with ZOE Broadcasting Network through its blocktime agreement to air A2Z on ZOE's VHF channel 11.

Frequency takeover by AMBS
On January 5, 2022, Advanced Media Broadcasting System, backed by the Villar Group through Planet Cable, was awarded a provisional authority license for the Channel 2 analog frequency, later with new call sign DZMV-TV and its digital counterpart Channel 16 frequency by the National Telecommunications Commission for 18 months. The station made its soft launch on September 13, 2022 as All TV.

Digital television

Digital channels

UHF Channel 43 (647.143 MHz)

UHF Channel 16 (485.143 MHz)

Notes:

See also
 List of ABS-CBN Corporation channels and stations
 ABS-CBN
 All TV
 DZMV-TV
 DZMM Radyo Patrol 630
 MOR 101.9
 S+A

References

 
Television stations in Metro Manila
Television channels and stations established in 1953
Digital television stations in the Philippines
Assets owned by ABS-CBN Corporation
Television channels and stations disestablished in 2020
Defunct television stations in the Philippines